Prunum capense, common name the Cape marginella, is a species of sea snail, a marine gastropod mollusk in the family Marginellidae, the margin snails.

Description

Distribution

References

 Steyn, D.G. & Lussi, M. (1998) Marine Shells of South Africa. An Illustrated Collector's Guide to Beached Shells. Ekogilde Publishers, Hartebeespoort, South Africa, ii + 264 pp.
 Cossignani T. (2006). Marginellidae & Cystiscidae of the World. L'Informatore Piceno. 408pp

External links
 Krauss, F. (1848) Die Südafrikanischen Mollusken. Ein Beitrag zur Kenntniss der Mollusken des Kap- und Natallandes und zur Geographischen Verbreitung derselben mit Beschreibung und Abbildung der neuen Arten. Ebner and Seubert, Stuttgart, 140 pp., 6 pls.
 Gould, A. A. (1861). Description of new shells collected by the United States North Pacific Exploring Expedition. Proceedings of the Boston Society of Natural History. 7: 385–389
 Reeve, L. A. (1864–1865). Monograph of the genus Marginella. In: Conchologia Iconica, or, illustrations of the shells of molluscous animals, vol. 15, pls 1–27 and unpaginated text. L. Reeve & Co., London 
  Reeve, L. A. (1865). Monograph of the genus Ovulum. In: Conchologia Iconica, or, illustrations of the shells of molluscous animals, vol. 15, pl. 1-14 and unpaginated text. L. Reeve & Co., London.

Marginellidae